The small toadlet (Uperoleia minima) is a species of frog in the family Myobatrachidae.
It is endemic to Australia.
Its natural habitats are subtropical or tropical dry lowland grassland and subtropical or tropical seasonally wet or flooded lowland grassland.

References

Uperoleia
Amphibians of Western Australia
Kimberley (Western Australia)
Taxonomy articles created by Polbot
Amphibians described in 1981
Frogs of Australia